Racecourse station or Racecourse railway station may refer to:

 Aintree Racecourse station, Liverpool, England
 Albury Racecourse railway station, New South Wales, Australia
 Bundamba Racecourse station, Queensland, Australia
 Cheltenham Racecourse railway station, Cheltenham in Gloucestershire, England
 Flemington Racecourse railway station, Victoria, Australia
 Newbury Racecourse station, Newbury, Berkshire, England
 Racecourse railway station (Brisbane), Ascot Racecourse, Brisbane, Australia
 Racecourse station (MTR), Sha Tin Racecourse, Hong Kong
 Werribee Racecourse railway station, Melbourne, Australia.
 Wetherby Racecourse railway station, Wetherby, West Yorkshire, England
 Williamstown Racecourse railway station, Melbourne, Australia